William Evelyn was an Irish Anglican priest in the 17th century.

Evelyn was educated at Trinity College, Dublin. He was Archdeacon of Achonry from 1755 to 1760. He died in 1770.

References 

Archdeacons of Achonry
18th-century Irish Anglican priests
1770 deaths